Benjamin Collins Brodie may refer to:

Sir Benjamin Collins Brodie, 1st Baronet (1783–1862), English physiologist and surgeon
Sir Benjamin Collins Brodie, 2nd Baronet (1817–1880), English chemist

See also
Ben Collins (disambiguation)